Michael Truman (25 February 1916, in Bristol, England – 11 July 1972, in Newbury, Berkshire) was a British film producer, director and editor.

Educated at London University, he worked for Ealing Studios editing such films as It Always Rains on Sunday (1947) and Passport to Pimlico (1949) and latterly as producer of films like The Titfield Thunderbolt (1953). As a director, he mainly worked in television on such series as Danger Man.

Selected filmography

Editor
 Talking Feet (1937)
 Stepping Toes (1938)
 They Came to a City (1944)
 Johnny Frenchman (1945)
 Pink String and Sealing Wax (1945)
 Bedelia (1946)
 It Always Rains on Sunday (1947)
 Saraband for Dead Lovers (1948)
 Passport to Pimlico (1949)
 A Run for Your Money (1949)

Director
 Touch and Go (1955)
 Danger Man (1960-1962)
 Go to Blazes (1962)
 The Saint (1962-1969)
 Girl in the Headlines (1963)
 Daylight Robbery (1964)
 Koroshi (1968) TV together with Peter Yates

References

External links

1916 births
1972 deaths
British film editors
English film directors
English film producers
Film people from Bristol
20th-century English businesspeople